Herbert R. Schaal (born 7 July 1940) is an American landscape architect, educator, and firm leader notable for the broad range and diversity of his projects, including regional studies, national parks, corporate and university campuses, site planning, botanical gardens, downtowns, highways, cemeteries, and public and private gardens. Schaal is one of the first landscape architects to design children's gardens, beginning in the 1990s with Gateway Elementary, Gateway Middle, and Gateway Michael Elementary school grounds in St. Louis, Missouri, the Hershey Children's Garden at the Cleveland Botanical Gardens, and Red Butte Garden and Arboretum.

Early life
Schaal grew up in Oakland, California, where he spent many hours in the neighborhood empty lot exploring nature, digging tunnels, and building forts. His connection to nature deepened as a Boy Scout and camp counselor. He was also influenced at an early age by his father, Rudolf J. Schaal, a landscape architect who emigrated from Germany in the 1930s. As a teenager, Schaal accompanied his father to job sites and learned the craft of shaping the ground, building structures, and planting. After high school, Schaal attended California State Polytechnic University, Pomona and received the Bachelor of Science in Landscape Architecture degree in 1962.

Career

Schaal's first year of practice was for Kenneth R. Anderson Associates in California. In 1964, he moved to Raleigh, North Carolina to work for his former instructor, Richard Moore. Moore had become the chair of the landscape architecture department at North Carolina State University's School of Design and principal of his private practice office, Megatech.

In 1966, Schaal accepted a full-time teaching position at the State University of New York College of Environmental Science and Forestry, where he earned a master's degree in landscape architecture four years later.  He taught design and graphics with an emphasis on using perspective drawing as part of the design process. He developed the “Proportional Method of Perspective Drawing,”  which was subsequently taught in American landscape architecture programs. This method is described in Nicholas Dines’ book, Landscape Perspective Drawing, where the author recounts a meeting over coffee with Schaal in the 1970s where Schaal “sketched a one-point perspective depth proportioning system on a table napkin that eliminated the need to project from a measured plan.”

In 1970, Schaal joined the San Francisco office of Eckbo Dean Austin and Williams, later known as EDAW. His first project used geographic information system technology and an association with Jack Dangermond, founder of Esri, to site a power plant and transmission lines for the Pacific Gas and Electric Company (PG&E) Davenport Project near Santa Cruz, California. This project established a new service for the firm which led to many large area siting studies. Schaal was then recognized as an authority on utility siting and later became an associate author of a text book on the subject.

In 1974, desiring a more rural lifestyle for his family Schaal moved to Fort Collins, Colorado, where he acquired the High Meadows Ranch near Rocky Mountain National Park and established EDAW’s Rocky Mountain Office. As an EDAW principal, vice president, and board member for 18 years, he played a role in the firm's growth from 4 to 32 offices worldwide.

In 1980, Schaal began providing planning and design services for the Denver Botanic Gardens, including the design of the Alpine Rock Garden, which was recognized by Garden Design Magazine as the “premier example of the art of rock gardening in North America” and national park projects including work for three of the most prestigious parks: Yellowstone National Park, Grand Canyon National Park and Yosemite National Park. During this period, Schaal also established and directed the EDAW Summer Student Program at his High Meadows Ranch, which for over 25 years, recruited promising landscape architecture students from universities to participate in real national and international projects with EDAW principals. The American Society of Landscape Architects recognized the importance of the program in 2000 with the Landscape Architecture Award of Excellence. Under Schaal's guidance EDAW’s Rocky Mountain Office grew to over 40 employees in various disciplines addressing a wide range of award-winning projects, including parks of all scales, zoos, botanical gardens, urban design, trails, waterfronts, highways and streetscapes, office parks, and environmental studies.

Schaal stepped down from overseeing the office in 1988 and concentrated his efforts on sustainable planning and design of university campuses, public gardens, and private estates. During this period, he completed dozens of projects at Washington University in St. Louis. Building on his experience with the Denver Botanic Gardens, he created master plans and designed gardens for over 20 botanical gardens and arboretums nationwide, including the Coastal Maine Botanical Gardens. In the design of children’s environments, Schaal is credited with systematically including all five senses and applying Howard Gardner’s theory of multiple intelligences. Schaal has designed “over 20 unique children’s gardens across the country,” including at the Cheyenne Botanic Gardens, the first public children's garden to be Platinum certified by Leadership in Energy and Environmental Design (LEED); the 4-acre children's garden at Morton Arboretum; and the Olson Family Roof Garden at St. Louis Children's Hospital, a horticultural therapy garden. Schaal's sustainable design work related to estates is typified by projects like Mark Rockefeller’s Eagle Rock Ranch and South Fork Lodge in Swan Valley, Idaho where Schaal was asked “to spearhead long-term improvements and environmental restoration” including “the creation of a submerged wetland wastewater treatment system” adjacent to the Snake River. After EDAW was acquired by AECOM in 2005, Schaal remained as a principal. He continued his work on public gardens including an ambitious master plan and innovative memorial garden design for the 300-acre historic Bellefontaine Cemetery in St. Louis, Missouri.

Schaal retired from AECOM in 2012 and spends most of time gardening, painting, consulting, and managing the forest at his High Meadows Ranch. The American Society of Landscape Architects has recognized his work with more than 60 regional and national awards. In 2008 Schaal was named Designer of the Year by the American Horticultural Society, which “established him as one of the most acclaimed contemporary landscape architects.” His work has been characterized by evocative drawings, on-site collaborative workshops, orderly assemblies of environmental decision-making factors, attention to sustainability, and sense of place. Schaal's drawings, design and planning reports, publications, and project photography are archived at the North Carolina State University Libraries Special Collections Research Center.

Family
Schaal married Cynthia J. Lechner in 1990. He had four children from his previous marriage to Diane E. Neill.

Selected projects
Campus and Institutional
 Gateway Elementary School, Gateway Middle School, and Gateway Michael School, St. Louis, Missouri, 1993
 Washington University Medical Center, Streetscape Master Plan, St. Louis, Missouri, 1996
 University of Wyoming, Prexy's Pasture, Laramie, Wyoming, 2001
 Washington University in St. Louis, S. 40 Housing, LEED Silver, St. Louis, Missouri, 2010
Cemeteries
 Bellefontaine Cemetery Master Plan, St. Louis, Missouri, 2012
 Wildwood Valley Memorial Gardens at Bellefontaine Cemetery, St. Louis, Missouri, 2012
Children's Gardens
 Cleveland Botanical Gardens, Hershey Children's Garden, 1998
 Morton Arboretum, Children's Discovery Center, Chicago, Illinois, 2002
 Naples Botanical Garden, Children's Garden, Naples, Florida, 2006
 Cheyenne Botanic Gardens, Paul Smith Children's Garden, 2006
 Coastal Maine Botanical Gardens, Bibby and Harold Alfond Children's Garden, 2009
Corporate Facilities
 Rocky Mountain Energy Company Office Park, Broomfield, Colorado, 1980
 Hewlett-Packard Facilities, Fort Collins, Colorado and Loveland, Colorado, 1981
 Agilent Technologies, Loveland, Colorado, 2008
Healing and Contemplative Gardens
 Denver Botanic Gardens, Morrison Horticultural Therapy Demonstration Garden, Denver, Colorado, 1984
 St. Louis Children's Hospital, Olson Family Garden Terrace Roof Garden, St. Louis, Missouri, 1998
 VCU Massey Cancer Center, Richmond, Virginia, 2005
Land Planning
 Sea Ranch, Final Phase Development Plans, Northern California, 1972
 Phantom Canyon, 10,000-acre Rural Subdivision Master Plan, Northern Colorado, 1985
 Tyson Research Center, 2,000-acre Management Plan, St. Louis, Missouri, 2001
Major Siting Studies
 Pacific Gas and Electric Company (PG&E) Davenport, 285-square-mile Transmission Line Siting Study, Santa Cruz Mountains, California, 1971
 Project Sanguine, 22,500-square-mile Naval Facilities Engineering Command (NAVFAC) Siting Study, Upper Peninsula, Michigan and Central Texas, 1973
 Rawhide Power Plant, 3,000-square-mile Siting Study, Northern Colorado, 1978
Municipal Parks
 Sunset Ridge Park, Westminster, Colorado, 1984
 Addenbrooke Park, Lakewood, Colorado, 1987
 Highlands Ranch Civic Green Park, Highlands Ranch, Colorado, 1999
Public Gardens
 Denver Botanic Gardens, Alpine Rock Garden, Denver, Colorado, 1981
 AmeriFlora '92 Entry Plaza, Columbus, Ohio, 1990
 Red Butte Garden and Arboretum, Terrace Gardens, Salt Lake City, Utah, 1995
 San Francisco Botanical Garden, Zellerbach Garden of Perennials redesign, San Francisco, California, 2001
 Coastal Maine Botanical Gardens, Central Gardens Master Plan, Boothbay, Maine, 2004
 Smithgall Woodland Garden Master Plan, Gainesville, Georgia, 2012
Regional, State, and Federal Parks
 Yellowstone National Park and Grand Canyon National Park, Siting Studies and Native Landscape Restoration Projects, 1979, 1983, 1986 
 Blue Mountains National Park Concept Plans for Echo Point, Katoomba, New South Wales, Australia, 1994
 Yosemite National Park, Park Wide Campgrounds Study, California, 2002
 Mount St. Helens National Volcanic Monument Visitor Centers, Oregon, 2003
Residential
 Bruce & Martha Clinton Residence, Mount Thomas, Colorado, 2005
 Mark Rockefeller’s 4000-acre Eagle Rock Ranch, Swan Valley, Idaho, 2006
 Pond Bank House, Cherry Hills Village, Colorado, 2011
Restoration
 Love Greenway, Englewood, Colorado, 1988
 Clear Creek (Colorado) 1/4-mile Creekside Restoration, Denver, Colorado, circa 2000
Sustainable Design
 Concordia Resort Sustainable Master Plan, Virgin Islands, 1995
 Alberici Group Headquarters LEED Platinum Landscape Concepts, St. Louis, Missouri, 2003
 Washington University in St. Louis, Earth and Planetary Sciences, LEED Gold, St. Louis, Missouri, 2010
Trails
 Colorado State Trails Master Plan, Colorado, 1981
 Cheyenne Greenway 15-mile-long Bikeway Plan, Cheyenne, Wyoming, 1992
 Loveland Basin to Bakerville 5-mile-long mountain bike trail on Clear Creek near the Eisenhower Tunnel, Colorado, 1995
Transportation
 Interstate 25 (I-25) Freeway 11-mile Landscape Study, Pueblo, Colorado, 1983
 15 miles of interstate freeway through Colorado Springs, Colorado, 1990
Visual Analysis
 Pacific Gas and Electric Company (PG&E) Visual Impact Methodology for Transmission Lines, California, 1974
 Rawhide Power Plant north of Fort Collins, Colorado, 1978
Urban Design
 Fort Collins Downtown Development Project, Fort Collins, Colorado, 1975
 Loveland Civic Center, Loveland, Colorado, 1987
Zoological Parks
 Navajo Nation Zoological and Botanical Park, Window Rock, Arizona, 1985 
 Cheyenne Mountain Zoo Asian Highlands, Colorado Springs, Colorado, 1993 
 Caldwell Zoo Children's Park Plan and Entry, Tyler, Texas, 2005

Selected awards 
 California State Polytechnic University, Pomona, Outstanding Graduate in Landscape Architecture, 1962
 Award of Merit, American Society of Landscape Architects, Davenport Studies, 1972
 Award of Honor, American Society of Landscape Architects, Creating Land for Tomorrow, 1979
 Award of Merit, American Society of Landscape Architects, Colorado State Trails Master Plan, 1981
 Award of Merit, American Society of Landscape Architects, Hewlett-Packard Fort Collins, 1981
 Award of Merit, American Society of Landscape Architects, Alpine Rock Garden, Denver Botanic Gardens, 1983
 Award of Merit, American Society of Landscape Architects, Rocky Mountain Energy Company Headquarters, 1983
 President's Award, Colorado Chapter ASLA, Interstate 25 Pueblo Landscape Master Plan, 1984
 President's Award, Colorado Chapter ASLA, Morrison Horticultural Demonstration Center, Denver Botanic Gardens, 1985
 Merit Award, Colorado Chapter ASLA, AmeriFlora '92 Entry, 1992
 Award for Outstanding Example of Western Planning Ethic, Colorado Chapter ASLA, Planning the Green Zone, 1994
 Award of Honor, American Horticultural Therapy Association, Morrison Horticultural Demonstration Center, Denver Botanic Gardens, 1995
 Merit Award, American Society of Landscape Architects, Terrace Garden at Red Butte Garden and Arboretum, 1999
 Merit Award, American Society of Landscape Architects, Gateway Elementary, Gateway Middle, and Gateway Michael Schools, Educational Garden, 2000
 Landscape Architecture Award of Excellence, American Society of Landscape Architects, EDAW Summer Student Program, 2000
 Tucker Award of Excellence, Terrace Garden at Red Butte Garden and Arboretum, 2001
 President's Award of Excellence, Colorado Chapter ASLA, Fort Collins Community Horticulture Center Master Plan, 2001
 President's Award, Colorado Chapter ASLA, Lena Meijer Children's Garden Master Plan, 2002
 Merit Award, American Society of Landscape Architects, Mount St. Helens National Volcanic Monument, United States Forest Service, 2005
 President's Award of Excellence, Illinois Chapter ASLA, Morton Arboretum Children's Garden, 2006
 President's Award of Excellence, Colorado Chapter ASLA, Central Gardens Master Plan, Coastal Maine Botanical Gardens, 2006 
 Land Stewardship Designation, Colorado Chapter ASLA, Cheyenne Botanic Gardens, Children's Village for Sustainable Living, 2007 
 Honor Award, Maryland and Potomac Chapters ASLA, Norfolk Botanical Garden, World of Wonders Children's Garden, 2008
 American Horticultural Society, Landscape Designer of the Year, 2008
 Honor Award for Design, Colorado Chapter ASLA, Coastal Maine Botanical Gardens, Lerner Garden of the Five Senses, 2010
 Merit Award for Design, St. Louis Chapter ASLA, Wildwood Memorial Garden at Bellefontaine Cemetery, 2016

Publications 
 “Denver Botanic Gardens Design and Master Plan” The Bulletin, American Association of Botanical Gardens and Arboreta, Vol. 13, No.2 (1979): 45.
 “The Alpine and Rock Garden” The Bulletin, American Association of Botanical Gardens and Arboreta, Vol. 13, No.2 (1979): pp. 45–51.
 The Rose Garden” The Bulletin, American Association of Botanical Gardens and Arboreta, Vol. 13, No.2 (1979): 51.Siting of Major Facilities (associate author, 1983): 
 “In the Overall Design of Private Gardens” Rocky Mountain Alpines (1986): 256 
 “Disturbed Landscapes” Time-Saver Standards for Landscape Architecture, Second Edition (1998): 640 
 “A Place of Solace: Massey Cancer Center Healing Garden” Journal of Chinese Landscape Architecture, Vol. 31, No. 1 (2015): pp. 24–29.

References

External links 
 Herb Schaal Landscape Architecture Papers, 1963-2017
 Herb Schaal Oral History and Lecture, 2007
 The Cultural Landscape Foundation (Herbert R. Schaal, Pioneer)

1940 births
Living people
American landscape architects
People from Oakland, California
California State Polytechnic University, Pomona alumni